Blastocladia coronata is a species of fungus from India.

References

External links
 Mycobank entry

Fungi described in 1988
Blastocladiomycota